Dizhi or Di Zhi may refer to:

Earthly Branches, twelve traditional Chinese (later East Asian) signs, usually combined with the ten Heavenly Stems to form the Sexagenary cycle
Emperor Zhi, a mythological emperor of ancient China
Dizhi Subdistrict (地直街道), a subdistrict in Tiexi District, Siping, Jilin, China

See also
Dizi (disambiguation)